St. Augustine Catholic High School is a private, Roman Catholic high school in Tucson, Arizona, United States.  It is located in the Roman Catholic Diocese of Tucson.

Background
The school had approximately 200 students enrolled in 2015. It recently received accreditation from the Western Catholic Educational Association (WCEA).

External links
 School website

References

Catholic secondary schools in Arizona
Catholic Church in Arizona
Schools in Tucson, Arizona
Educational institutions established in 2003
2003 establishments in Arizona